The Piano Trio No. 3 in B-flat major, K. 502, was written by Wolfgang Amadeus Mozart in 1786. It is scored for piano, violin and cello.

Movements 
The work is in three movement form:

References

External links

Piano trios by Wolfgang Amadeus Mozart
Compositions in B-flat major
1786 compositions